Culcha Vulcha is an album by American jazz fusion group Snarky Puppy that was released on April 29, 2016.  The album includes performances by a number of musicians associated with the band and called "the Fam".  The band's first studio album in eight years since Bring Us the Bright, it was recorded at the Sonic Ranch in Tornillo, Texas near El Paso and Atlantic Sound Studios in Brooklyn, New York, by Nic Hard.

Reception
Culcha Vulcha received moderate praise upon release, with NPR extolling the "core sonic idea [of Culcha Vulcha], it's an intricate melody over a multifaceted groove...It gathers ideas openly and avidly from all over the world". John Fordham of The Guardian remarked that "Jazzers might still balk at the high-concept planning, but it's remarkable how much polish has been applied without cramping the band's irrepressible creative energy."

Culcha Vulcha also received the Grammy Award for Best Contemporary Instrumental Album in 2016. In a release on social media, the band offered thanks, saying, "It's the first time that we've been awarded a Grammy for an album that represents who we are (99 percent) of the time—just us, without special guests, playing our own music."

Track listing
Source+

Personnel
Source+ 
 Michael League – electric bass guitar, Moog Sub Phatty,  nylon-string guitar, Mellotron, acoustic bass, Moog bass, piccolo bass, ukulele bass, baritone guitar, handclaps 
 Bob Lanzetti – electric & acoustic guitars
 Mark Lettieri – electric & acoustic guitars, baritone guitar, Hammertone guitar
 Chris McQueen – electric & acoustic guitars
 Zach Brock – violin
 Cory Henry – clavinet, organ, Mellotron, Omni, Moog, piano
 Bill Laurance – Fender Rhodes, piano, Synthex, Moog bass, clavinet 
 Shaun Martin – vocoder & talkbox 
 Bobby Sparks – clavinet, Minimoog, Moog bass 
 Justin Stanton – piano, Fender Rhodes, Omni, Prophet 6, Moog, Synthex. Arp Axxe 
 Jay Jennings – trumpet, flugelhorn
 Mike 'Maz' Maher – trumpet, flugelhorn, vocals
 Chris Bullock – tenor saxophone, bass clarinet, flute, alto flute, keyboards 
 Bob Reynolds – tenor saxophone
 Larnell Lewis – drum set
 Robert "Sput" Searight – drum set
 Jason 'J.T.' Thomas – drum set
  – percussion: timbal, repenque, kanjira, caixa, congas, talking drum, kalimbas, handclaps
 Nate Werth – percussion: trap set, floor tom, cowbells, chimes, caixa, tambourine, congas, shaker, angklung, handclaps
 Marcelo Woloski – percussion: djembe, shakers, surdo, triangle, caixa, angklung, tang-tang, reco-cowbell, daf, bombo legüero, donkey jaw, kalimba, effects, handclaps

Charts

References

2016 albums
Snarky Puppy albums
Grammy Award for Best Contemporary Instrumental Album
GroundUPmusic albums
Albums recorded at Sonic Ranch